

Events
Tommaso Buscetta becomes a made member of the Porta Nuovo Mafia family in Palermo, Sicily.
July 16 – Charles Yarnowsky, a syndicate mobster in Jersey City, New Jersey is found stabbed to death in Clifton.
August 10 – John DiBiaso, a lieutenant of Charles Yarnowski, is murdered, shot dead in front of his home in Elizabeth, New Jersey, only 25 days after Yarnowski's death.

Arts and literature

Births

Deaths
July 16 – Charles Yarnowsky, Jersey City, New Jersey syndicate mobster
August 10 – John DiBiaso, Charles Yarnowski lieutenant

References

Organized crime
Years in organized crime